4th Marine Imam Reza Brigade is a marines brigade of Islamic Republic of Iran Navy based in Anzali, Gilan Province.

References 

Special forces of Iran
Iranian marine brigades
Gilan Province